Once Deportivo de Ahuachapan is a Salvadoran professional football club based in Ahuachapán, El Salvador. The club was founded on 20 July 2019, and plays its home games at Estadio Simeón Magaña.

History
On July 20, 2019, Primera Division awarded a new license to ownership group who wanted a team based in Ahuachapan, This came about after Pasaquina were stripped of their license and were forced to sell their spot, the new team filled the vacancy in the market created by the dissolution of Once Municipal three years earlier. On July 21, 2019, the club announced that Once Deportivo, which had previously been used as a placeholder name for the club, would be the official team name.

Once Deportivo announced Uruguayan Pablo Quiñones as its head coach on July 20, 2017, joining general director Roberto Campos in a search for players. Segio Calero was signed as the club's first  player on July 22, 2019.

Once Deportivo started its inaugural season against Municipal Limeno on 29 July 2019, losing 3–0. The club's first ever goal was a goal scored by Anthony Roque in the Once's third league game, a 2–1 loss against Aguila. Once Deportivo's first win was a 2–1 victory over Isidro Metapan, which came in the fifth round of their first Primera Division season on 18 August 2019.  Once Deportivo finished their first season  in twelfth position. They failed to make it into the top six teams to reach the finals.

Following the conclusion of the season, Once Deportivo sacked Pablo Quinones and hired Spaniard Juan Dieguez to be the new coach. The club bolstered their campaign with the hiring of international players such as Mexicans Marco Granados and Edgar Solis, Nicaraguan Luis Fernando Copete, and Salvaodran such as Marcelo Tejada.
The club started the season strongly winning six games, drawing two games and losing three games. On March, 2020 the season was suspended due to coronavirus pandemic. A week later FESFUT the organiser of El Salvador football declared that the final round of matches and the final would be cancelled due to the coronavirus pandemic. The title was subsequently awarded to Once Deportivo, who finished on top of the points table after the eleven rounds that were played. This is Once Deportivo first title in their history. However, at the FESFUT extraordinary meeting on 29 April 2020, it was decided that the Clausura 2020 season title originally awarded to Once Deportivo would be retracted and the title would not be awarded. However, they would remain the third representative of El Salvador in the 2020 CONCACAF League.

Honours

Domestic honours

Leagues
 Primera División Salvadorean and predecessors 
 Champions (0) : None (2020 Clausura originally awarded but later retracted)

Stadium
 Estadio Simeón Magaña, Ahuachapán (2019-)
 Estadio Ana Mercedes Campos, Sonsonate (2019)

Once Deportivo plays its home games at Estadio Simeon Magana in Ahuachapan, Ahuachapan. However the club was not allowed to play at the Estadio Simeon Magana was to unable to meet the requirements to play dor the first part of the Clausura 2019 therefore they moved their games to the Estadio Ana Mercedes Campos, Sonsonate. However they received approval to return to the Estadio Simeon Magana.

Sponsorship
Companies that Once Deportivo currently has sponsorship deals with for 2023–2024 includes:
 Tony Sports – Official Kit Suppliers
 Pepsi – Official sponsors
 Mister donut – Official sponsors
 Canal 4 – Official sponsors
 La Geo – Official sponsors
 Sistema Fedecredito – Official sponsors
 ALCASA – Official sponsors
 Electrolit – Official sponsors

Club records
 First victory in the Primera Division for Once Deportivo: 2-1 Isidro Metapan, August 17, 2019
 First goalscorer for Once Deportivo:Anthony Roque v Aguila, August 10, 2019
 First goalscorer in the Primera Division for Once Deportivo: Anthony Roque v Aguila, August 10, 2019
 Largest Home victory, Primera División: 3-0 v Chalatenango, 9 March 2020
 Largest Away victory, Primera División: 4-0 C.D. Sonsonate, November 18, 2019
 Largest Home loss, Primera División:  4-0 v El Vencedor, 25 August 2019
 Largest Away loss, Primera División:  0-6 Isidro Metapan, 18 October 2020.
 Highest home attendance: 2,000 v Primera División, 2018
 Highest away attendance: 1,000 v Primera División, San Salvador, 2018
 Highest average attendance, season: 49,176, Primera División
 Most goals scored, Apertura 2019 season, Primera División: 21, TBD, 2018
 Worst season: Primera Division Apertura 2019: 3 win, 5 draws and 14 losses (14 points)
 First CONCACAF Champions League match: Once Deportivo 1–1 Communcaciones; Estadio Doroteo Guamuch Flores; 5 August 2021.

Individual records
 Record appearances (all competitions):  Kevin Menjivar, 95 from 2019 to 2022
 Record appearances (Primera Division):  Salvadoran Kevin Menjivar, 95 from 2019 to 2022
 Most capped player for El Salvador: 63 (0 whilst at Once Deportivo), TBD
 Most international caps for El Salvador while a Once Deportivo player: 2, Julio Sibrian and Melvin Cartagena.
 Most caps won whilst at Once Deportivo: 2, Julio Sibrian and Melvin Cartagena.
 Record scorer in league:  Bryan Paz, 19
 Most goals in a season (all competitions): TBD, 62 (1927/28) (47 in League, 15 in Cup competitions)
 Most goals in a season (Primera Division): David Rugamas, 12
 First goal scorer in International competition: Edgar Medrano (v. Communicaciones; Estadio Doroteo Guamuch Flores; 5 May 2021)

Current squad
:

Players with dual citizenship
   TBD

Out on loan

In

Out

Coaching staff 2022/2023

Coaching staff

Management Staff 2019/25

Personnel Management staff

List of Coaches

Notable players

Captains
Only captains in competitive matches are included.
Players marked in bold are still playing in the professional team.

Most appearances 

Bolded players are currently on the Once Deportivo roster.

Goals

Bolded players are currently on the Once Deportivo roster.

Most shutouts 

Bolded players are currently on the Once Deportivo roster.

Internationals
 Luis Copete
 David Rugamas
 Julio Sibrian
 Melvin Cartagena
 Marcelo Díaz

References

External links

Football clubs in El Salvador
Association football clubs established in 2019
2019 establishments in El Salvador